Lake High School is a public high school in Lake Township, Stark County, Ohio.  It is the only high school in the Lake Local Schools district. Lake's sports teams are nicknamed the Blue Streaks, after the township’s history of oddly-colored lightning storms, and are a part of the Federal League along with Canton McKinley, GlenOak, Green, Hoover, Jackson, and Perry.

Ohio High School Athletic Association State Championships
 Girls Softball — 2005
 Wrestling — Mike Miller 2004-06
 Wrestling — Andrew McNally 2015
 Wrestling — Zac Carson 2015
 Cheer — 2018, 2020, 2022
 Cross Country - Nathan Moore 2020
 Track and Field (3200m run) - Nathan Moore 2021

Rivals
 Jackson High School
 North Canton Hoover High School
 Green High School

Notable alumni
 Dan Goodspeed, CFL player for the Saskatchewan Roughriders
 Jameson Konz, NFL player for the Seattle Seahawks
 David Holmes, Winner of ESPN's Dream Job
 Chandler Vaudrin, basketball player

Notes and references

External links
 District Website

High schools in Stark County, Ohio
Public high schools in Ohio